The Ethiopian People's Revolutionary Party (EPRP), informally known as Ihapa, is the first modern political party in Ethiopia, established in April 1972 (the founding congress was held from 2–9 April). Its first political program called for the overthrow of the Ethiopian monarchy, the removal of the feudal system, and the creation of a socialist democratic republic. The party was forced underground because the monarchy, headed by Emperor Haile Selassie, did not allow political parties or legal dissent.

Both the EPRP and another party, the All-Ethiopia Socialist Movement (MEISON) were enthusiastic supporters of the student-led 1974 Ethiopian Revolution that eventually led to the toppling of Emperor Haile Selassie and abolishing the monarchy the following year. However, following the rise of Mengistu Haile Mariam to power as leader of the ruling Derg, the military junta that had taken control of Ethiopia, ideological conflict developed between the various groups. 

The EPRP declared open war against the revolutionary government in 1976, and the government resolved to smash them as an act of self-defense in the urban areas. In the rural areas, Tigray and Gondar provinces, the guerrilla force of the party, known as the EPRA (Ethiopian People's Revolutionary Army), was also becoming active. The spiraling violence in the urban areas also led to the declaration of the infamous Red Terror campaign by the military regime against the EPRP and later MEISON. This bloody campaign caused the deaths of some 250,000 Ethiopians until it ended in 1978. The urban armed defense was pursued to an extent and dimension which harmed the party by forcing it to work in circumstances of unfavorable balance of forces.

History
The EPRP was founded under the name Ethiopian People's Liberation Organization (EPLO) in April 1972 in West Berlin, West Germany, by exiled Ethiopian students and with the assistance of the Democratic Front for the Liberation of Palestine. At this first congress, a Central Committee was elected and included Desta Tadesse, Kiflu Teferra, Kiflu Tadesse, Tesfaye Debessay, Berhane Meskel Reda, Iyasu Alemayehu, and Zeru Kehishen, with the latter four elected to the EPLO Politburo and Berhane Meskel Reda elected the organization's Secretary General.

For the first few years of its existence, the EPRP was of little importance until the arrival of the Revolution, after which it played a larger role. Over the year following the deposition of Haile Selassie, political and ideological conflict began to emerge between the EPRP and its major Marxist rival, MEISON. Part of their rivalry was based on the fact that, originally, the Derg had no political ideology, beyond the vague patriotic slogan of Itiopiya Tikdem "Ethiopia First" and turned to the leftist Student Movement, with its strong ideological grounding, for guidance; EPRP and MEISON were only two of a large number of groups which competed to be the Derg's political educators. Part of their rivalry was based on Marxist theory: for the Ethiopian Revolution to be an "authentic" one, there needed to be a vanguard party, and both groups wanted that role. Eventually, MEISON came to support the Derg and Mengistu, while the EPRP claimed that the Derg had betrayed the Revolution and stood in the way of a genuine "people's democracy". The political conflict ultimately escalated into violent conflict, with increasing fighting between the two groups. The violence reached its peak in 1976 when the EPRP began to launch attacks on public buildings and assassinate high-ranking Derg officials.

In response, Mengistu condemned the EPRP, claiming it had engaged in a campaign of "White Terror", and initiated a systematic and brutal campaign to exterminate supporters of the EPRP, initially with assistance from MEISON and officials of the local kebeles, known as the "Red Terror", against the EPRP and other political opponents. Surviving members of the EPRP were forced to flee the cities by August 1977, many fleeing to the group's rural stronghold on Mount Asimba in, among other places, Agame, where two of its founders, Tesfay Debessay and Zeru Kehishen, had family ties. There the EPRP received some support from the Eritrean Liberation Front (ELF). Although there were numerous meetings between the EPRP and other anti-government groups like the Tigray People's Liberation Front (TPLF), eventually the EPRP and the TPLF came to blows. EPRA units attacked TPLF units in two different locations in Agame on 23 February 1978, forcing them to evacuate the area. The TPLF brought two of its veteran companies from the west, and in a fierce counter-attack forced the EPRP fighters back to their bases at Mount Asimba. After a five-day battle, the TPLF captured their mountain stronghold, and the bulk of the defeated EPRP fled to sanctuary with the ELF. Eventually, many party members found their way to Gondar, continuing their struggle against both the Derg and the TPLF until Mengistu's government final defeat at the end of the Ethiopian Civil War in 1991.

References

Further reading

External links

EPRP website
American source detailing timeline of Red Terror (Currently not available)
Information on Red Terror

1972 establishments in Ethiopia
Communist parties in Ethiopia
Factions of the Ethiopian Civil War
Federalist parties in Ethiopia
Political parties established in 1972
Political parties in Ethiopia
Rebel groups in Ethiopia